Zoe Abigail Redei (born October 8, 1997) is an American professional soccer player who plays as a forward for National Women's Soccer League (NWSL) club Chicago Red Stars.

Club career

Chicago Red Stars
Redei made her NWSL debut in the 2020 NWSL Challenge Cup on July 1, 2020.

Personal life
Redei is of Hungarian descent through her father.

References

External links
 North Carolina profile

1997 births
Living people
American women's soccer players
Soccer players from Atlanta
American people of Hungarian descent
American sportspeople of Filipino descent
Women's association football forwards
North Carolina Tar Heels women's soccer players
Chicago Red Stars players
United States women's under-20 international soccer players
National Women's Soccer League players